The Story of a Small Town is a 1979 Taiwanese film, produced by Hsiao Chung Productions. The film revolves around a family living in a small town. Kenny Bee plays the male family member who is released from prison and falls in love with a mute woman (Joan Lin).

The film was remade as a TV series, featuring Yang Kuei-mei and Yin Xiaotian.

Cast and crew
Cast
 Kenny Bee
 Joan Lin, credited as Joan Lin
 Ko Hsiang-ting
 Lee Lieh
 Chen Jun-jieh, credited as Ou Di

Crew
 Li Hsing, director and supervisor
 Liu Teng-shan, story
 Chang Yung-hsiang, screenplay
 Chen Kun-hou, cinematography
 Tsai Cheng-pin, art director
 Chih Hsueh-fu, director of lighting
 Weng Ching-hsi, composer, credited as Tony Wong in this film and Tang Ni in other materials

Reception
In the 16th Golden Horse Film Festival and Awards (1979), this film won the Best Picture, Best Original Screenplay, Best Actress (Joan Lin), and Best Child Star (Weng Ching-hsi).

Music
, translated as either Small Town Story or Story of a Small Town, is a 1979 album by Teresa Teng. Tracks 1, 6, 7, and 8 are theme songs from the film. With the exception of track 7, the names of these tracks are different for each release.

The album was released by Kolin Records in Taiwan and by Polydor Records in Hong Kong and overseas. Polydor re-recorded the theme songs for its own edition and released this album as Taiwan's Love Songs 6: Small Town Story.

Weng Ching-hsi is credited as Tang Ni on this album.

Side A
Kolin: "Moment of Silence" — 2:13Polydor: "You Are in My Heart" — 2:54
 Music by Weng Ching-hsi, lyrics by Chuang Nu
 Sub-theme of the film; Polydor re-recording has additional, slightly different lyrics
 "", "On Your Mind" or "On My Mind", music by Weng Ching-hsi, lyrics by Suen Yi — 3:28
 "Poetry", written by Liu Chia-chang — 3:00
 "A piece of a fallen leaf", music by Takashi Miki, lyrics by Chuang Nu — 3:27
 "The September Story", music by Inaba Akira, lyrics by Suen Hei — 3:42
 Kolin: "Precious Small Town" — 2:11Polydor: "Spring in a Small Town" — 2:22
 Music by Weng Ching-hsi, lyrics by Chuang Nu
 Sub-theme of The Story of a Small Town

Side B
 "Small Town Story" ( / ) — 2:19 (Kolin) / 2:35 (Polydor)
 Music by Weng Ching-hsi, lyrics by Chuang Nu
 Main theme of The Story of a Small Town
 Kolin: "Quiet Lane" — 3:15Polydor: "Lane" ( / ) — 3:04
 Music by Weng Ching-hsi, lyrics by Chuang Nu
 Sub-theme of The Story of a Small Town
 "Me and You", music by Minoru Endo, lyrics by Lin Huang-kuen — 3:46
 Mandarin version of "", first sung in 1977 by Masao Sen
 "Free and at Leisure", music by Minoru Endo, lyrics by Lin Huang-kuen — 3:28
 "Place of First Loves", music by Liu Chia-chang; lyrics by Suen Hei — 2:27
 Originally sung by Chiang Lei
 "Thinking of You", music by Kimiaki Inomata, lyrics by Lin Huang-kuen — 3:28

References

External links 
 
 

1979 films
Taiwanese drama films
1970s Mandarin-language films
Films directed by Li Hsing
Films with screenplays by Chang Yung-hsiang